Gonakumbura Pangukarage Shalani Tharaka Wijayabandara (sinhala: ශලනි තාරකා; born 15 November 1990), popularly known as Shalani Tharaka, is a Sri Lankan actress and model. One of the most popular television actresses in Sri Lanka, Tharaka holds the title for the Sri Lankan beauty pageant Sirasa Kumariya which she won in 2007. Apart from acting, she is also a dancer, lyricist and author.

Early life
Tharaka was born on 15 November 1990 in Balangoda. Her father is Susantha Wijayabandara and mother Suraji Fernando is a beautician by profession. She had her primary education at St. Agnes Convent, Balangoda. After her primary education she moved to her mother's hometown Negombo and had her secondary education there onwards at Newstead Girls College where she studied western and Kandyan dancing styles.

Career
In 2007, when she was seventeen years old, she won the beauty pageant Sirasa Kumariya organized by Sirasa TV which brought her into mainstream popularity. Her maiden acting came through the television serial Poojasanaya directed by Sherly P. Delankawala. Her co-star in Poojasanaya was Suraj Mapa. Later she acted in many television serials in several genre such as Isuru Bawana, Hansi, Giridevi, Api Api Wage (I & II), Ganga Addara and Sanda Sanda Wage which gained popularity.

Apart from teledramas she has also contributed in the TV commercials for Hero Honda, Raino and Janet. She has also played parts in music videos such as Oya Dese by Prinyan, Mata Oya by D n S, Wasthuwe by Shafee ft. Delon.

In 2012, Tharaka made her maiden cinema appearance in the movie Selvam. She played the role of "Medhavi". Later she appeared in lead role in the horror film Spandana. She also contested in the second season of Sirasa Dancing Stars as well as Hiru Super Dancer.

On 19 September 2020, she was awarded both Best teledrama actress and Most popular teledrama actress at 16th Raigam Tele'es ceremony. It was the first time in 24 years where one actress won both awards at the same time. In 2021, she appeared in the Raffealla Fernando Celebrity Calendar along with many other Sri Lankan celebrities which is considered as one of the highest civilian honours awarded to an individual.

Selected television serials

Filmography

Awards

Sumathi Awards

|-
|| 2015 ||| Peoples' vote || Most Popular Actress || 
|-
|| 2015 ||| Handapana Gala || Best Upcoming Actress|| 
|-
|| 2018 ||| Peoples' vote || Most Popular Actress||

Raigam Tele'es

|-
|| 2015 ||| Punchi Walawwa || Jury Award || 
|-
|| 2016 ||| Peoples' vote || Most Popular Actress || 
|-
|| 2020 ||| Peoples' vote || Most Popular Actress || 
|-
|| 2020 ||| Ado || Best Actress || 
|-
|| 2022 ||| Kiya Denna Adare Tharam  || Most Popular Actress || 
|-

Derana Film Awards

|-
|| 2019 ||| Peoples' vote || Lux Glamorous Star  ||

SIGNIS OCIC Awards

|-
|| 2021 ||| Giridevi || Best Actress    ||

References

External links

ශලනි තාරකා මනාලියක් වෙයි
Interview with Shalani
ශලනි ආගම මාරු කරයි?
වැඩිපුර තියෙන්නේ හරසුන් නිර්මාණ – ශලනි තාරකා
ශලනි, මෙගා තහංචිය පැත්තකින් තියලා
Prostitutes became Actresses is the problem
I can’t Live without Love
අමතක නොවන සුබ පැතුමක්

1990 births
Living people
Sri Lankan television actresses
Sri Lankan film actresses
Sri Lankan female models
Sinhalese actresses
People from Ratnapura District